Iain Declan Softley (born 28 October 1956) is an English film director, producer, and screenwriter. His films include Backbeat, Hackers, The Wings of the Dove, K-PAX, The Skeleton Key, Inkheart and the BBC adaptation of Sadie Jones's novel The Outcast.

Career
Softley was educated at St Benedict's School, Ealing, London, and Queens' College, Cambridge University, where he directed a number of highly-praised theatrical productions. He worked for Granada TV and the BBC in the 1980s before moving on to music videos and film.

Softley's first film, the Stuart Sutcliffe biopic, Backbeat, which he wrote and directed, was released in 1994. It opened the Sundance Film Festival and went on to receive a BAFTA Award nomination for Best British Film. For his work on the film, Softley received Best Newcomer Awards from The London Film Critics Circle and Empire Magazine.

Following Backbeat, Softley directed the cyber thriller Hackers, starring Angelina Jolie and Jonny Lee-Miller. This was followed in 1997 by an adaptation of Henry James' novel, The Wings of the Dove, starring Helena Bonham-Carter. The film premiered at the Toronto and Venice Film Festivals, earned four Academy Award nominations, and won a number of awards including two BAFTAs and multiple acting honors for Bonham Carter.

Softley's next two films (released by Universal Pictures) topped the US box office: the sci-fi mystery film K-PAX, starring Kevin Spacey, and Jeff Bridges, and the suspense thriller, The Skeleton Key with Kate Hudson, Gena Rowlands and John Hurt.

Other film credits include: Inkheart, from Cornelia Funke's best-selling book, with Helen Mirren, Paul Bettany and Jim Broadbent; Trap for Cinderella, starring Tuppence Middleton and Alexandra Roach, which Softley adapted and directed from Sebastien Japrisot's French crime novel; and Curve starring Julianne Hough, produced by Blumhouse Productions and released by Universal Pictures in 2016.

In 2010, Softley directed a stage adaptation of Backbeat, which was co-written with Stephen Jeffreys. It premiered at the Citizens Theatre in Glasgow, before transferring to the Duke of York's Theatre, in London and then subsequently Toronto, Los Angeles and Berlin.

In 2016, it was announced that Softley will direct Icarus, based on the life of British/American astronaut, Michael Foale, which Softley has developed with writers Hilary Thompson and Laurence Coriat. He will co-produce the project through his company, Forthcoming Films. Softley attended Queens' College, Cambridge at the same time as Foale.

Aside from his work in film, Softley has also worked in television. In 2012, he directed the short film, The Man, as part of Sky Arts' Playhouse Presents strand. The film was a satirical take on the clandestine Bilderberg Group and starred Stellan Skarsgard, Zoe Wannamaker, Hayley Atwell and Stephen Fry. In 2015, the BBC broadcast a two-part adaptation of author Sadie Jones' novel The Outcast which Softley also directed. The film was warmly received by The Guardian, with Julia Raeside writing: "The tone set by Iain Softley's beautifully restrained direction and the careful use of music creates a real feeling of loss from the start, just as in the book, but he somehow avoids all hammy visual foreshadowing and narrative signposting, so often used to gee a plot along".

Production company
Together with his wife, film producer Sarah Curtis, Softley runs Forthcoming Films, which produces and develops their respective projects. Past productions include: Backbeat, On a Clear Day, Hysteria, Trap for Cinderella and Ophelia.

Future productions include: the Michael Foale biopic Icarus.

Personal life
Softley and Curtis live in London. Together, they have three children.

Filmography

Films

Television

Musical video

 How Could an Angel Break My Heart by Toni Braxton (1997)

References

External links

1958 births
Living people
English film directors
People educated at St Benedict's School, Ealing
Alumni of Queens' College, Cambridge
Horror film directors